Vestfjord, meaning "West Fjord" in the Danish language, is a fjord in King Christian X Land, eastern Greenland.
This fjord is part of the Scoresby Sound system in the area of Sermersooq municipality.

Geography

Two large glacier branches have their terminus in the Vestfjord, the Døde Bræ from the northwest and the Vestfjord Glacier from the southwest —the latter aligned with the fjord. They flow into the head of the Vestfjord at the fjord's western end and a nunatak reaching a height of  rises between the two glaciers.

Geologically this fjord is part of the Vestfjord-Hinksland gneiss and schist zone crystalline complex.

See also
List of fjords of Greenland

References

External links
Holocene glacimarine sedimentation, inner Scoresby Sund
Fjords of Greenland
Scoresby Sound

ceb:Vestfjord (fyord sa Grenland)
sv:Vestfjord (fjord i Grönland)